Mahamakut Buddhist University or MBU is one of the two public Buddhist universities in Thailand.

History 
Founded in 1893 as an educational institute for monks, by King Chulalongkorn in remembrance of his late father King Mongkut. The Thai government granted the university a status of public university in 1997, integrating MBU into the Thai higher education system.

Colleges and faculties 
Mahamakut Buddhist University is composed of four academic faculties: Religion and Philosophy Faculty, Humanities Faculty, Social Sciences Faculty, and Education Faculty. In addition, the university also offer a teachers' training program as well as various academic services to the public.

The university began offering master's degree programs in 1987. The Ph.D. program of Buddhist Studies was established in 2005.

References

External links 
Mahamakut Buddhist University

1893 establishments in Siam
Buddhism in Thailand
Religion in Bangkok
Buddhist universities and colleges in Thailand
Educational institutions established in 1893
Universities and colleges in Bangkok
Universities in Thailand